Maria Bueno successfully defended her title, defeating Sandra Reynolds in the final, 8–6, 6–0 to win the ladies' singles tennis title at the 1960 Wimbledon Championships.

Seeds

  Maria Bueno (champion)
  Darlene Hard (quarterfinals)
  Christine Truman (semifinals)
  Ann Haydon (semifinals)
  Angela Mortimer (quarterfinals)
  Zsuzsa Körmöczy (second round)
  Jan Lehane (withdrew)
  Sandra Reynolds (final)

Jan Lehane withdrew due to injury. Her opponent in the first round received a walkover into the second round.

Draw

Finals

Top half

Section 1

Section 2

Section 3

Section 4

Bottom half

Section 5

Section 6

Section 7

Section 8

References

External links
 

Wimbledon Championships
Wimbledon Championships
Women's Singles
Wimbledon Championship by year – Women's singles